The Turners Falls Road Bridge (officially White Bridge) is a concrete and steel road bridge over the Connecticut River in the U.S. state of Massachusetts. It carries Turners Falls Road and connects the town center of Greenfield and the village of Turners Falls (in the town of Montague).

History 
The current bridge is the second on this site.  Previously, a suspension bridge constructed in 1871 and known as the "Lower Suspension Bridge" was located at the site. The old bridge was constructed with funds from the towns of Greenfield and Montague and cost about $36,000. A road connecting the bridge to Greenfield center was laid out by the following year. The bridge was constructed primarily to allow laborers in Greenfield to easily go to the newly developing village of Turners Falls. The previous bridge was severely damaged in the 1936 flood and the current bridge was constructed soon after.

In the 1920s, Route 2 (former New England Route 7) originally left Greenfield via Turners Falls Road, crossing the old suspension bridge into the village of Turners Falls. Route 2 left Turners Falls via Millers Falls Road. In 1932, a more modern bridge capable of handling the increased automobile traffic, the French King Bridge, opened further upstream and Route 2 was relocated to its modern alignment along French King Highway. The former alignment through Turners Falls was designated as Route 2A. The Route 2A designation remained on Turners Falls Road until the 1960s.

The Massachusetts Highway Department started a rehabilitation project in 2010, which is, as of May 2015, almost done.

See also 
List of crossings of the Connecticut River

References 
 Bridge Inventory Data on NationalBridges.com

Footnotes

External links 
 Image of the original Lower Suspension Bridge

Bridges over the Connecticut River
Montague, Massachusetts
Bridges completed in 1871
Bridges completed in 1936
Bridges in Franklin County, Massachusetts
Road bridges in Massachusetts
Steel bridges in the United States
Girder bridges in the United States